Udom Suk station is a BTS skytrain station, on the  in Bang Na District, Bangkok, Thailand.  The station is located on Sukhumvit Road at Soi Udom Suk (Sukhumvit Soi 103), to the north of Bang Na intersection. It is a part of the 5.52 km skytrain extension from On Nut to Bearing station opened in 2011.

Udom Suk station connects to buses, vans or taxis along Bangna-Bang Pakong Highway to places such as CentralPlaza Bangna shopping center, Bang Na Campus of Ramkhamhaeng University, communities and industrial estates in Bang Phli District, and Suvarnabhumi Campus of Assumption University

See also
 Bangkok Skytrain

BTS Skytrain stations